Nemanja Nedović (born 16 June 1991) is a Serbian professional basketball player for Crvena zvezda of the Adriatic League and the EuroLeague. He also represented the senior Serbian national basketball team internationally.

Professional career

Early years
Nedović began to train in Italy with Ascoli basketball when he was 11 years of age. He lived there because his father was playing professional handball locally with the Ascoli Piceno Handball. After that, he trained for two years in Nova Varoš. In 2005, he moved to Crvena zvezda at the age of 15. He had success in the junior competition, as in 2008 when he became champion with the junior team of Crvena zvezda.

After that, he moved to the first team where he finally made a breakthrough professionally. In his first season with the team, he was scoring in double digits, forcing the team management to extend a contract with him for one more season. He stayed in the club until June 2012.

Lietuvos rytas
In the summer of 2012, he signed a contract with the Lithuanian team Lietuvos rytas Vilnius. In his first EuroLeague season with Rytas he averaged 9.8 points, 2.5 rebounds and 2.1 assists per game.

Golden State Warriors
On 27 June 2013, Nedović was selected with the 30th overall pick in the 2013 NBA draft by the Phoenix Suns. He was later traded to the Golden State Warriors on draft night. He is also the last draft pick called by David Stern in his career as a commissioner of the NBA. On 9 July 2013 he signed with the Warriors. During his rookie season, he had multiple assignments with the Santa Cruz Warriors of the NBA Development League.

In July 2014, Nedović joined the Warriors for the 2014 NBA Summer League where he averaged 9.4 points, 2.0 rebounds and 2.2 assists in five games. On 11 November 2014, he was waived by the Warriors.

Spanish League
On 14 November 2014, Nedović signed a two-year deal with the Spanish team Valencia. Over five EuroLeague games he played for Valencia, he averaged 8 points and 3.6 assists per game. In July 2015, he parted ways with the team.

On 2 July 2015, the day he parted ways with Valencia, he signed a one-year contract with Unicaja. On 30 May 2016 he signed a new two-year contract with the team. In April 2017, he won the EuroCup with Unicaja after beating Valencia BC in the Finals. On 7 June 2017 Nedović re-signed with Unicaja for the 2017–18 season. On 27 June 2018 Nedović officially left Unicaja after 3 years.

Olimpia Milano
On 27 June 2018 Nedović signed a multi-year deal with the Italian club Olimpia Milano.

Panathinaikos
On 13 July 2020 Nedović signed with Panathinaikos of the Greek Basket League and the EuroLeague. In 10 league games during the 2020-2021 campaign, he averaged 14.8 points, 1.4 rebounds and 2.9 assists, playing around 21 minutes per contest. Additionally, in 25 EuroLeague games, he averaged 16 points (shooting with 51% from the field, 37% from the 3-point line, and 84% from the free-throw line), 1.9 rebounds and 3.7 assists, playing around 26 minutes per contest.

On 5 July 2021 Nedović officially renewed his contract with the Greek club for another two years. In 26 league games during the 2021-2022 campaign, he averaged 14.4 points, 2.3 rebounds and 2.6 assists, playing around 23 minutes per contest. Additionally, in 26 EuroLeague games, he averaged 14.3 points (shooting with 53% from the field, 39% from the 3-point line, and 85% from the free-throw line), 2.2 rebounds and 3.2 assists, playing around 24 minutes per contest.

Return to Serbia
On July 7, 2022, Nedović officially returned to Crvena zvezda after ten years abroad, signing a three-year contract.

National team career

Nedović was a member of U20 Serbia national basketball team in 2009, 2010, and 2011 at FIBA Europe Under-20 Championship. In 2012, he played with Serbia men's national basketball team at FIBA EuroBasket 2013 qualification. During Eurobasket 2013, Nedović's game saw many ups and downs as he led a very young and inexperienced, but nonetheless talented Serbia team, showing great performances against Lithuania and particularly France in a 77-65 blowout, in which he outplayed one of his role models, Tony Parker, scoring 17 points on 5/8 shooting for three. Serbia ended up being swept easily by Spain in the quarterfinals as Nedović and the entire Serbia team struggled offensively.

He represented Serbia once again at the EuroBasket 2015 under head coach Aleksandar Đorđević, after missing the 2014 World Cup. In the first phase of the tournament, Serbia dominated in the toughest Group B with 5–0 record, and then eliminated Finland and Czech Republic in the round of 16 and quarterfinal game, respectively. However, they were stopped in the semifinal game by Lithuania with 67–64, and eventually lost to the host team France in the bronze-medal game with 81–68. Over 9 tournament games, Nedović averaged 8.4 points, 2.6 rebounds and 2.4 assists per game on 52% shooting from the field.

Nedović also represented Serbia at the 2016 Summer Olympics where they won the silver medal, after losing to the United States in the final game with 96–66.

Player profile
Nedović's strong points are his ball-handling skills and elite athleticism, as he proved to be one of the very best athletes in European basketball. He is known for an excellent first step and can play easily above the rim. He was labeled during the 2013 NBA draft as "The European Derrick Rose" by some ESPN analysts because of his athleticism, explosiveness, versatility, similar size, and ability to play both guard positions. After he was drafted by the Golden State Warriors, Mark Jackson, the team coach, has said that Nedović "is a very good athlete with highly deceptive speed."

Career statistics

NBA

Regular season

|-
| style="text-align:left;"| 
| style="text-align:left;"| Golden State
| 24 || 0 || 5.9 || .205 || .167 || .875 || .6 || .5 || .0 || .0 || 1.1

Playoffs

|-
| style="text-align:left;"| 2014
| style="text-align:left;"| Golden State
| 1 || 0 || .0 || – || – || – || .0 || .0 || .0 || .0 || .0

EuroLeague

|-
| style="text-align:left;"| 2012–13
| style="text-align:left;"| Lietuvos Rytas
| 10 || 5 || 23.3 || .367 || .343 || .700 || 2.5 || 2.1 || .8 || .2 || 9.8 || 6.8
|-
| style="text-align:left;"| 2014–15
| style="text-align:left;"| Valencia
| 5 || 2 || 19.3 || .405 || .400 || 1.000 || 1.0 || 3.6 || 1.4 || .2 || 8.0 || 7.0
|-
| style="text-align:left;"| 2015–16
| style="text-align:left;" rowspan=2| Unicaja
| 23 || 8 || 15.1 || .391 || .279 || .750 || .8 || 1.9 || .3 || .1 || 7.4 || 4.8
|-
| style="text-align:left;"| 2017–18
| 24 || 18 || 25.1 || .429 || .358 || .845 || 2.0 || 4.8 || .6 || .1 || 16.8 || 16.7
|-
| style="text-align:left;"| 2018–19
| style="text-align:left;" rowspan=2| Milano
| 15 || 7 || 23.5 || .461 || .414 || .806 || 2.5 || 2.7 || .8 || .1 || 11.5 || 10.4
|-
| style="text-align:left;"| 2019–20
| 17 || 3 || 16.5 || .373 || .343 || .829 || 1.2 || 1.7 || .3 || .1 || 7.9 || 6.2
|-
| style="text-align:left;"| 2020–21
| style="text-align:left;" rowspan=2| Panathinaikos
| 25 || 13 || 26.1 || .428 || .370 || .835 || 1.9 || 3.7 || .7 || .2 || 16.0 || 14.9
|-
| style="text-align:left;"| 2021–22
| 26 || 11 || 23.6 || .446 || .384 || .853 || 2.2 || 3.2 || .5 || .1 || 14.3 || 13.2
|- class="sortbottom"
| style="text-align:center;" colspan=2| Career
| 145 || 67 || 21.5 || .422 || .362 || .826 || 1.8 || 3.0 || .6 || .1 || 12.3 || 11.0

See also

List of Olympic medalists in basketball
 List of Serbian NBA players

References

External links

Nemanja Nedović at abaliga.com
Nemanja Nedović at acb.com 
Nemanja Nedović at draftexpress.com
Nemanja Nedović at eurobasket.com
Nemanja Nedović at euroleaguebasketball.net

1991 births
Living people
ABA League players
Baloncesto Málaga players
Basketball League of Serbia players
Basketball players at the 2016 Summer Olympics
BC Rytas players
Golden State Warriors players
KK Crvena zvezda players
Lega Basket Serie A players
Liga ACB players
Medalists at the 2016 Summer Olympics
National Basketball Association players from Serbia
Panathinaikos B.C. players
Olimpia Milano players
Olympic basketball players of Serbia
Olympic medalists in basketball
Olympic silver medalists for Serbia
People from Nova Varoš
Phoenix Suns draft picks
Point guards
Santa Cruz Warriors players
Serbia men's national basketball team players
Serbian expatriate basketball people in Greece
Serbian expatriate basketball people in Lithuania
Serbian expatriate basketball people in Spain
Serbian expatriate basketball people in the United States
Serbian men's basketball players
Shooting guards
Valencia Basket players